Carlia quinquecarinata is a species of skink, commonly known as the five-keeled rainbow-skink or five-carinated rainbow-skink, in the genus Carlia. It is endemic to Darnley Island in Australia.

References

Carlia
Reptiles described in 1877
Skinks of Australia
Endemic fauna of Australia
Taxa named by William John Macleay